Christian Charles Burns (born September 4, 1985) is an American-Italian professional basketball player for Germani Brescia of the Italian Lega Basket Serie A, top league of Italia. He also represents the Italian national team.

Early career
Between his sophomore and senior year, Burns grew from 5'11" to 6’6“. After having played soccer and basketball, he focused on basketball his senior year, averaging 19.8 points, 15.3 rebounds and 3.2 blocks a game for Hamilton High School West in Hamilton Township, Mercer County, New Jersey, while taking home County Player of the Year and Third-Team All-State (by the Associated Press) honors.

College career
He started his college career at Quinnipiac, where he spent his freshman and sophomore year. He made 48 appearances for the Bobcats, averaging 3.5 points and 2.9 boards a contest. Burns transferred to NCAA Division 2 school Philadelphia University for his junior year and made an impact right away, scoring 16.7 points, grabbing 9.8 rebounds and blocking 2.2 shots per game in 2005–06. He earned Daktronics NCAA Division II National Player of the Year, ECAC Division II Player of the Year, Herb Good Small College Player of the Year and CACC Player of the Year honors his senior season (2006–07) among many other accolades, when putting up averages of 21.7 points, 11.2 rebounds and 2.1 blocks per contest.

Professional career
Coming out of college in 2007, he tried to make the Philadelphia 76ers' summer league roster, but eventually was not picked to join the team. Burns then launched his overseas career, signing with AZS Koszalin from Poland. In the following years, he played for teams in a number of different countries including Portugal, Germany, Ukraine, Israel, Italy, Russia, Czech Republic and the United Arab Emirates. In the 2010–11 campaign, when playing for Ferro-ZNTU Zaporozhye, he was named the Eurobasket.com All-Ukrainian Superleague Player of the Year. He made the Eurobasket.com All-Italian SerieA 1st Team in 2013 and won the 2015 Czech national championship with CEZ Nymburk.

Burns obtained Italian citizenship in 2016. In 2017, he represented the Italian men's national team at the European Championships.

On June 20, 2018, the president of Olimpia Milano, Livio Proli, said the club reached an agreement with Burns for 2018–19 season in the Italian LBA. On June 28, 2018, Burns officially signed a deal with Milano. In May 2019, he tested positive for the banned substance Clostebol Metabolita. In July 2019, he was cleared by Italy's national anti-doping tribunal.

On July 4, 2020, he returns to Basket Brescia Leonessa. That season Brescia missed the Serie A playoffs and Burns played the Serie A2 playoffs with Napoli Basket helping them to achieve the promotion to the Serie A.

The Basketball Tournament (TBT) (2016–present) 
In the summers of 2016 and 2017, Burns played in The Basketball Tournament on ESPN for the Broad Street Brawlers.  He competed for the $2 million prize, and for the Brawlers, he averaged 18 points per game in 2017.  Burns helped the Brawlers reach the second round, but lost to Team Colorado 111–95.

Career statistics

Domestic Leagues 

|-
| style="text-align:left;" | 2007–08
| style="text-align:left;" |  Koszalin
| style="text-align:left;" | Polish Basketball League
| 30 || 19.0 || 51.2% || 28.0% || 68.4% || 4.2 || 0.3 || 0.9 || 0.2 || 8.9
|-
| style="text-align:left;" | 2008–09
| style="text-align:left;" |  Porto
| style="text-align:left;" | Liga Portuguesa de Basquetebol
| 34 || 32.6 || 46.2% || 19.1% || 71.9% || 6.7 || 1.3 || 2.2 || 1.2 || 17.7
|-
| style="text-align:left;" | 2009–10
| style="text-align:left;" |  ratiopharm Ulm
| style="text-align:left;" | Basketball Bundesliga
| 34 || 27.7 || 46.0% || 28.2% || 65.6% || 6.3 || 1.2 || 1.3 || 0.4 || 17.7
|-
| style="text-align:left;" | 2010–11
| style="text-align:left;" |  Zaporizhya
| style="text-align:left;" | Ukrainian Basketball SuperLeague
| 57 || 30.6 || 51.9% || 25.8% || 71.3% || 7.9 || 1.3 || 1.5 || 0.5 || 16.1
|-
| style="text-align:left;" | 2011–12
| style="text-align:left;" |  Elitzur Netanya
| style="text-align:left;" | Israeli Basketball Premier League
| 9 || 30.1 || 40.9% || 33.3% || 87.5% || 7.4 || 2.4 || 1.4 || 0.4 || 14.3
|-
| style="text-align:left;" | 2012–13
| style="text-align:left;" |  Sutor Montegranaro
| style="text-align:left;" | Serie A
| 30 || 26.7 || 52.5% || 40.7% || 77.5% || 7.0 || 0.7 || 1.2 || 0.2 || 14.9
|-
| style="text-align:left;" | 2013–14
| style="text-align:left;" |  Enisey
| style="text-align:left;" | VTB United League
| 20 || 28.2 || 48.7% || 41.3% || 73.7% || 5.3 || 1.2 || 1.2 || 0.4 || 14.6
|-style="background:#AFE6BA;"
| style="text-align:left; background:#f8f9fa;" rowspan=2 | 2014–15
| style="text-align:left; background:#f8f9fa;" rowspan=2 |  Nymburk
| style="text-align:left;" | National Basketball League
| 22 || 15.7 || 55.0% || 18.2% || 76.0% || 4.1 || 0.9 || 2.2 || 0.4 || 9.5
|-
| style="text-align:left;" | VTB United League
| 21 || 24.0 || 43.0% || 30.8% || 72.9% || 5.6 || 0.8 || 0.8 || 0.5 || 10.6
|-
| style="text-align:left;" | 2015–16
| style="text-align:left;" |  Al Wasl
| style="text-align:left;" | United Arab Emirates
| style="text-align:center;" colspan=10 |  no data available 
|-
| style="text-align:left;" | 2016–17
| style="text-align:left;" |  Germani Basket Brescia
| style="text-align:left;" | Serie A
| 25 || 23.1 || 45.2% || 30.0% || 66.2% || 6.6 || 1.0 || 1.3 || 0.3 || 11.4
|-
| style="text-align:left;" | 2017–18
| style="text-align:left;" |  Red October Cantù
| style="text-align:left;" | Serie A
| 31 || 30.5 || 50.4% || 27.6% || 64.2% || 10.0 || 1.3 || 1.3 || 0.2 || 14.2
|-
| style="text-align:left;" | 2018–19
| style="text-align:left;" |  AX Armani Exchange Milano
| style="text-align:left;" | Serie A
| 36 || 13.5 || 57.1% || 26.3% || 66.7% || 3.4 || 0.3 || 0.7 || 0.3 || 4.7

European Competitions

|-
| style="text-align:left;" | 2010–11 FIBA EuroChallenge
| style="text-align:left;" |  Zaporizhya
| 2 || 2 || 37.5 || 48.3% || 25.0% || 75.0% || 7.0 || 1.5 || 2.0 || 0.5 || 16.0 || n/a
|-
| style="text-align:left;" | 2014–15 Eurocup Basketball
| style="text-align:left;" |  Nymburk
| 13 || 12 || 24.3 || 47.0% || 30.8% || 78.6% || 4.7 || 1.1 || 1.3 || 0.5 || 11.8 || 11.2
|-
| style="text-align:left;" | 2014–15 EuroChallenge
| style="text-align:left;" |  AX Armani Exchange Milano
| 14 || 0 || 3.1 || 40.0% || 0.0% || 100% || 0.8 || 0.1 || 0.0 || 0.1 || 1.0 || 0.6

National team

|-
| style="text-align:left;"| 2017
| style="text-align:left;"| EuroBasket
| style="text-align:left;"|  Italy
| 4 || 0 || 8.8 || 42.9% || 50.0% || 100% || 1.5 || 0.8 || 0.5 || 0.3 || 2.3

References

External links
 Legabasket profile
 Philadelphia University bio

1985 births
Living people
American expatriate basketball people in Germany
American expatriate basketball people in Israel
American expatriate basketball people in Italy
American expatriate basketball people in Poland
American expatriate basketball people in Portugal
American expatriate basketball people in Russia
American expatriate basketball people in the Czech Republic
American expatriate basketball people in the United Arab Emirates
American expatriate basketball people in Ukraine
American men's basketball players
AZS Koszalin players
Basketball Nymburk players
Basketball players from Trenton, New Jersey
Basket Brescia Leonessa players
BC Enisey players
BC Zaporizhya players
Centers (basketball)
Elitzur Maccabi Netanya B.C. players
FC Porto basketball players
Hamilton High School West alumni
Israeli Basketball Premier League players
Italian expatriate basketball people in Germany
Italian men's basketball players
Lega Basket Serie A players
Naturalised citizens of Italy
Olimpia Milano players
Pallacanestro Cantù players
People from Hamilton Township, Mercer County, New Jersey
Philadelphia Rams men's basketball players
Power forwards (basketball)
Quinnipiac Bobcats men's basketball players
Ratiopharm Ulm players
Sutor Basket Montegranaro players
Napoli Basket players